(), is a common law injunction to restrain wrongful acts which are threatened or imminent but have not yet commenced.  The 1884 English legal case of Fletcher v. Bealey [28 Ch.D. 688 at p. 698] stated the necessary conditions for the equity courts to grant an injunction in such cases:
 proof of imminent danger;
 proof that the threatened injury will be practically irreparable; and
 proof that whenever the injurious circumstances ensue, it will be impossible to protect plaintiff’s interests, if relief is denied.

Brevia anticipantia
 remedies were writs at common law. According to Lord Coke, "there be six writs of law that may be maintained quia timet, before any molestation, distress, or impleading; as. 1. A man may have his writ or mesne, before he be distrained. 2. A warrantia chartae, before he be imploded. 3. A monstraverunt, before any distress or vexation. 4. An audita querela, before any execution sued. 5. A curia claudenda before any default of inclosure. 6. A ne injustice vexes, before any distress or molestation. And those are called brevia anticipantia, writs of prevention."

injunctions

 injunctions refer to a type of injunction in English law obtained where a wrong is anticipated.  literally means "because he fears".

According to Graigola Merthyr Co Ltd v Swansea Corpn to obtain a  injunction there must be an immediate threat to do something. Moffat's Trusts Law states that a  injunction can both prohibit something or mandate something to occur.

References

Legal documents with Latin names
Equity (law)
Writs of prevention